Batha may refer to:
 Batha Region, one of the regions of Chad
 Batha Prefecture, a former division of Chad
 Batha, Lebanon, one of the villages in Keserwan District in Lebanon
 Batha, an alternate term for garrigue, or Mediterranean scrubland
 Batha (Riyadh), a commercial area in Riyadh, Saudi Arabia
Batha (demon) a kind of daemon in Kerala